Fox's shaggy rat (Dasymys foxi) is a species of rodent in the family Muridae. It is found only in Nigeria.
Its natural habitats are moist savanna, subtropical or tropical seasonally wet or flooded lowland grassland, swampland, and plantations. It is threatened by habitat loss.

References

Endemic fauna of Nigeria
Dasymys
Rodents of Africa
Mammals described in 1912
Taxa named by Oldfield Thomas
Taxonomy articles created by Polbot